The Institute of Business Administration was established in 2000 as a private institute for business and commerce studies. It became the College of Business Administration (CBA) in 2003. It is now known as the University of Business and Technology.

Accreditation 
CBA is accredited by the Saudi Ministry of Higher Education.
In June 2012, UBT was awarded the National Accreditation NCAAA (National Commission for Academic Accreditation and Assessment). CBA is the first private college in Saudi Arabia that is working towards the Institutional and Programs accreditation from the NCAAA for the period May 2010 to May 2014 for the following five programs:
 Accounting 
 Finance
 Human Resource
 Marketing
 Management Information System

CBA did not apply for accrediting supply chain management program since "the students had not graduated from the program yet", as announced by Dr. Abdullah Dahlan (board of trustees, chairman).

Memberships 
 Member of AACSB.
 Member of EFMD.

Academics
The college offers a BBA degree with the following specializations:
 Accounting
 Finance
 Human Resources Management
 Marketing
 Management Information Systems
 Supply Chain Management

Notable alumni
Abdulaziz bin Turki Al Saud, Saudi Sports Minister

References

2000 establishments in Saudi Arabia
Educational institutions established in 2000
Universities and colleges in Saudi Arabia
Education in Jeddah
Private universities and colleges in Saudi Arabia